Dion Smith (born 3 March 1993) is a New Zealand cyclist, who currently rides for UCI WorldTeam .

Career
Smith was born in Taupaki in Rodney District. He attended Massey High School.

In September 2015 it was announced that he would join  for the 2016 season. In June 2017, he was named in the startlist for the 2017 Tour de France. In stage six of the race, he was part of the sprint for the finish line and given the same time as the winner, Marcel Kittel. In August 2019, he was named in the startlist for the 2019 Vuelta a España.

In September 2022 it was announced that Smith would join team  for the 2023 and 2024 season.

Major results

2011
 2nd Overall Tour de l'Abitibi
2013
 1st Stage 4 McLane Pacific Classic
 4th Tour de Delta
 6th Philadelphia International Cycling Classic
2014
 1st Stage 1 Redlands Bicycle Classic
 National Under-23 Road Championships
2nd Road race
3rd Time trial
 3rd Philadelphia International Cycling Classic
 7th Overall Tour de Beauce
2015
 1st Overall Cascade Cycling Classic
 2nd Road race, National Under-23 Road Championships
 2nd Winston-Salem Cycling Classic Criterium
 3rd Overall New Zealand Cycle Classic
1st  Young rider classification
 3rd Overall Tour de Beauce
1st  Points classification
1st  Young rider classification
 4th Overall Joe Martin Stage Race
1st  Young rider classification
 5th Overall Tour of Alberta
2016
 1st The REV Classic
 1st Beaumont Trophy
 2nd Road race, National Road Championships
 5th Overall Four Days of Dunkirk
 5th Overall Ronde van Midden-Nederland
1st Stage 1 (TTT)
 5th Grote Prijs Jef Scherens
 5th Münsterland Giro
 10th Overall Herald Sun Tour
 10th Overall Tour de Yorkshire
 10th Cadel Evans Great Ocean Road Race
2017
 3rd Road race, National Road Championships
2018
 2nd Paris–Chauny
 3rd Overall Tour of Belgium
 8th Coppa Sabatini
 Tour de France
Held  after Stages 2–4
2019
 3rd Japan Cup
 7th Hammer Limburg 
2020
 1st Coppa Sabatini
 6th Milan–San Remo
 9th Milano–Torino
2021
 7th Gran Premio di Lugano
2022
 2nd Per sempre Alfredo
 2nd Prueba Villafranca de Ordizia
2023
 7th Cadel Evans Great Ocean Road Race

Grand Tour general classification results timeline

References

External links

1993 births
Living people
New Zealand male cyclists
20th-century New Zealand people
21st-century New Zealand people